Minnesota State Highway 23 (MN 23) is a state highway that stretches from southwestern to northeastern Minnesota. At  in length, it is the second longest state route in Minnesota, after MN 1.

This route, signed east–west, runs roughly diagonally across Minnesota from southwest to northeast. It indirectly connects Duluth to Sioux Falls, South Dakota, and passes through the cities of St. Cloud, Willmar, and Marshall.

Route description
MN 23 directly serves Pipestone, Marshall, Granite Falls, Willmar, Paynesville, Cold Spring, St. Cloud, Foley, Milaca, Mora, Hinckley, Sandstone, and Duluth.

For a majority of the Willmar area, MN 23 runs concurrently with U.S. Highway 71 (US 71), which includes a freeway bypass of the city. MN 23 crosses the Minnesota River at Granite Falls, and the Mississippi River in St. Cloud, over the Granite City Crossing bridge.

Running over surface streets in certain towns, MN 23 is also known as:

Division Street in St. Cloud
4th Street in downtown Milaca
Forest Avenue East in Mora, between MN 65 and Oslin Road
Grand Avenue in Duluth; the section of Grand Avenue that is marked MN 23 is from 59th Avenue West and I-35 (in West Duluth) to Idaho Street (in the Morgan Park neighborhood)
Commonwealth Avenue in the Gary-New Duluth neighborhood of the city of Duluth
Evergreen Memorial Highway in the Fond du Lac neighborhood of the city of Duluth

Parks and monuments
The highway serves:
Split Rock Creek State Park in Pipestone County at Ihlen
Pipestone National Monument
Camden State Park in Lyon County on the banks of the Redwood River
Banning State Park in Pine County on the banks of the Kettle River

Evergreen Memorial Scenic Drive
About  of MN 23 that travels through Pine, Carlton, and Saint Louis counties is officially designated the Veterans Evergreen Memorial Scenic Drive. This portion is between I-35 near Askov and the Gary-New Duluth neighborhood of Duluth, near MN 39. The scenic roadway offers views of Banning State Park, the Saint Louis River valley, and nearby Jay Cooke State Park.

The 2005 Minnesota Legislature officially designated the MN 23 Bridge over the Saint Louis River at Duluth (Fond du Lac neighborhood) as the Biauswah Bridge. On June 28, 2008, this bridge was dedicated as such in honor of American Indian veterans.

Segment in Wisconsin
MN 23 has the rare distinction of being a state highway that passes through another state. At 133rd Avenue West, along the southern edge of Duluth, MN 23 crosses the Saint Louis River into Douglas County, Wisconsin, in the Town of Superior, for  before re-entering Minnesota. On some maps, this section is designated "WISC-23", despite there being another Highway 23 in southern Wisconsin. There is no signage, however, along the highway that indicates the brief route across state lines. Nearby is the junction between MN 23 and MN 210 and Jay Cooke State Park.

History
MN 23 was authorized November 2, 1920, from Paynesville to Mission Creek, south of Hinckley. By 1933, the highway was paved between Roscoe and Cold Spring and from St. Cloud to Mission Creek. It was extended west to Benson and east to Duluth in 1934. Various sections of the highway were paved from the 1930s through the 1950s; the entire length was paved by 1961.

The section of present-day MN 23 from its southern terminus to Marshall was originally designated MN 39 until 1940. The section between Marshall and Willmar was originally designated MN 17 until 1940. The MN 23 designation originally extended west from New London to Benson along the modern MN 9; which was also MN 17 from around 1940 to the 1960s. MN 23 originally ran through Sandstone proper to just west of Askov along the route that later became MN 123; this was redesignated  1946.

From 1934 to 1963, the northern terminus for MN 23 was its junction with old US  61 and US 2 in West Duluth. From 1963 to 1997, MN 23 continued farther into Duluth proper as a business route using several local arteries including Michigan Street, West 1st Street, East 2nd Street, East 3rd Street, and East Superior Street. The former northern terminus for MN 23 during this time period was at the intersection of US 61 (now MN 61) and 60th Avenue East in Duluth. In 1997, the official northern terminus changed to its junction with I-35 at Grand Avenue in Duluth.

After completion of the I-35 freeway, the state maintained MN 23 through Hinckley and Sandstone; now MN 23 runs concurrentky with I-35 from Hinckley to Sandstone.

The four-lane US 71 / MN 23 bypass of Willmar was proposed in the 1960s. However a financial crisis in the early 1980s led to the northbound lanes being unpaved, and the bypass had been scaled down to a two-lane facility by the time it opened in 1985. Construction in 2001 completed the bypass to its original four-lane design.

The MN 23 expressway from Spicer to New London, and the expressway from Richmond to Waite Park (St. Cloud), were both completed by 2005.

In February 2008, a bus crash occurred on MN 23 near Cottonwood when a school bus carrying 28 students from Lakeview Public Schools was struck by a driver who ran through a stop sign which caused the bus to fall onto a pickup killing four students and injuring 17 others.

The DeSoto Bridge across the Mississippi River in St. Cloud was closed on March 20, 2008, after bent gusset plates were found in an inspection; similar to gusset plates that caused the I-35W Bridge in Minneapolis to collapse on August 1, 2007.  The DeSoto Bridge was demolished in October 2008, and a new replacement bridge, the Granite City Crossing, was completed on October 29, 2009.

The Paynesville Bypass project began on April 26, 2010. The project consists of constructing a four-lane bypass around Paynesville, running from County Road 6 (CR 6) in Kandiyohi County to CR 123 in Stearns County. The project was completed in July 2012. The project includes grading, construction of eight bridges, surfacing and lighting, and it cost $32.2 million (equivalent to $ in ).

Another project expanded MN 23 to four lanes from St. Cloud eastward to Foley, which began July 1, 2011, and finished sometime in late 2012. This project expanded an  segment of the highway. While this section is technically part of the St. Cloud-to-I-35 portion of the corridor (and thus has less overall priority), the increase in traffic along this particular stretch still necessitates and warrants expansion, as there have been major safety and mobility issues the last couple decades due to growth in the St. Cloud area.

Future
MnDOT has designated MN 23 as a medium-priority Interregional Corridor along the majority of its length. As such, there are long-range plans to expand significant portions of the highway from two to four lanes. This resulted in the creation of the Highway 23 Coalition, and its ultimate vision for MN 23 is a four-lane expressway running from its interchange with I-90 in the southwest corner of Minnesota northeastward to its interchange with I-35 near Hinckley, although severe funding shortages are currently limiting expansion to certain segments.

Currently, the section of highway that has the highest overall priority for expansion is the corridor between Willmar and St. Cloud. This is due in part to the corridor carrying a heavy volume of traffic (higher than what a standard two-lane highway is designed to safely carry), plus a subsequently higher-than-average accident rate. In addition, southwest Minnesota lacks four-lane access to both the Twin Cities (Minneapolis–Saint Paul) and the Interstate Highway System, and a MN 23 expressway from Willmar (which is the largest municipality in southwest Minnesota) to St. Cloud would greatly alleviate both these issues.

The "Gaps" project is a multi-stage project to widen MN 23 to four lanes in the two remaining two-lane sections between Willmar and St. Cloud. The  North Gap started expansion in May 2022, and is expected to complete in November 2023. The  South Gap is planned to begin in 2023 and be completed in 2024.

Major intersections

See also

Wisconsin State Trunk Highway System

References

External links

MN 23 at The Unofficial Minnesota Highways Page

023
Transportation in Rock County, Minnesota
Transportation in Pipestone County, Minnesota
Transportation in Lyon County, Minnesota
Transportation in Yellow Medicine County, Minnesota
Transportation in Chippewa County, Minnesota
Transportation in Kandiyohi County, Minnesota
Transportation in Stearns County, Minnesota
Transportation in Benton County, Minnesota
Transportation in Mille Lacs County, Minnesota
Transportation in Kanabec County, Minnesota
Transportation in Pine County, Minnesota
Transportation in Carlton County, Minnesota
Transportation in Douglas County, Wisconsin
Transportation in St. Louis County, Minnesota